Ficus bojeri is a species of plant in the family Moraceae. It is endemic to Seychelles.  It is a fairly small ficus, or fig, tree with small branches and oval-shaped leaves.  It is greyish-brown in color.  The fruit hangs from the trunk of the tree on centimeter long twigs.

References

References
 

bojeri
Endemic flora of Seychelles
Trees of Seychelles
Vulnerable flora of Africa
Taxonomy articles created by Polbot